Middletown Area High School is a small, suburban, public high school in Middletown, Pennsylvania. It is the only high school operated by Middletown Area School District. Middletown Area High School serves: the boroughs of Middletown and Royalton and Lower Swatara Township in Dauphin County. In the 2015–2016 school year, enrollment was 653 pupils in 9th through 12th grades.

Extracurriculars
Middletown Area High School offers students a wide variety of clubs, activities and an extensive sports program. The district mascot is a Blue Raider and the colors are blue and gold. The school's marching band is the Blue Wave Marching Band.

Sports
In 2001, the boys soccer team won the Class AA State title. In 2016, the football team set a new record of wins in a season. The team went 14-1, with their only loss to Beaver Falls in the Class AAA State Championship game. The 2017 team would tie that record, only falling to Quaker Valley in the Class AAA State Championship.
The District funds 17 varsity sports:

Boys
Baseball - AAAA
Basketball - AAAA
Cross Country - AA
Football - AAA
Golf - AA
Soccer - AA
Tennis - AA
Track and Field - AAA
Wrestling - AA

Girls
Basketball - AAA
Cheerleading 
Cross Country - AA
Field Hockey - A
Soccer - AA
Softball - AAA
Tennis - AA
Track and Field - AA
Volleyball - AA

According to PIAA directory January 2017

References

Public high schools in Pennsylvania
Schools in Dauphin County, Pennsylvania
Susquehanna Valley